Yehuda Zvi Blum (born 2 October 1931) is an Israeli professor of law and diplomat who served as Permanent Representative of Israel to the United Nations from 1978 to 1984.

Biography
Yehuda Z. Blum was born in Bratislava, Czechoslovakia in 1931, and observed his bar-mitzvah in the Bergen-Belsen concentration camp. He immigrated to British Mandate for Palestine in 1945. Blum earned his law degree from the University of London. His doctoral thesis, in 1961, was on Historic titles in international law.

Law career
Blum joined the faculty of Hebrew University in 1965 and until retiring in 2001 occupied the Hersch Lauterpacht Chair in International Law there.  He has served as a senior research scholar at the University of Michigan, and visiting professor in the law schools of the University of Texas, New York University, Tulane University, the USC Gould School of Law, and others. In 1968 he served as a UNESCO Fellow at the University of Sydney in Australia. He has written several books and published many scholarly articles on international legal problems in law journals in English, Hebrew and German. He is currently the law editor of the Encyclopaedia Hebraica.

Diplomatic career
In 1968, Blum worked for the United Nations Office of Legal Counsel. He was a member of Israeli delegation to 3rd UN Conference on the Law of the Sea in 1973. In 1976 he was part of the Israeli delegation to the 31st session of UN General Assembly. He served as Ambassador and Permanent Representative of Israel to the United Nations for six years, from 1978 to 1984.

He was a member of the Israeli negotiating team that drafted the peace treaty with Egypt (Camp David Accords) in 1978, the Blair House negotiations in March 1979 and the Israeli legal team at the Taba arbitration talks between Israel and Egypt between 1986 and 1988.

As the Ambassador to the United Nations, Blum was often critical of it, saying that the UN "fans the flames of the Middle East conflict."  The New York Times quoted him as saying that "The essence of the Middle East conflict has always been and remains the persistent enmity of Arab states towards the Jewish national renaissance."
As UN envoy, he made headlines for "scolding" a group of 133 American Jewish law students protesting Israel's invasion of Lebanon and protesting Jewish settlements in West Bank and Gaza.  He questioned the factual, as well as the moral position, of the students' view, saying that they "have not given the slightest indication of their willingness to bear any personal consequences of their patronizing and fortuitous advice."

Published works
Historic Titles in International Law (1965)
Secure Boundaries and Middle East Peace (1971) (with an introduction by Julius Stone)
For Zion's Sake (1987)
Eroding the United Nations Charter (1993)

References

International law scholars
Israeli legal scholars
Academic staff of the Hebrew University of Jerusalem
Alumni of the University of London
1931 births
Jurisprudence academics
Bergen-Belsen concentration camp survivors
Living people
Slovak Jews
Czechoslovak emigrants to Mandatory Palestine